Duluth Air National Guard Base is a United States Air National Guard base located on the grounds of Duluth International Airport. It is home to the 148th Fighter Wing.

History
The City of Duluth purchased the original property for the airport in 1929 from St. Louis County. Subsequently, in 1930, the airfield was dedicated as a public airport. The airport was called the Williamson-Johnson Municipal Airport until 1963 at which time it was renamed Duluth International Airport.

Air Defense Command

After World War II, the U.S. Air Force constructed permanent and semi-permanent facilities on land leased from the City of Duluth for use by the active Air Force and the Air National Guard. Beginning in 1948, the Minnesota Air National Guard built permanent facilities on the east end of the field. Air Defense Command (ADC) activated the 11th Fighter Interceptor Squadron on 1 December 1952 and the 515th Air Defense Squadron on 16 February 1953 under the Central Air Defense Force 31st Air Division.  The 11th flew from Duluth until 1968, flying F-51H Mustangs, F-86D Sabrejets, F-89H/J Scorpions, F-102A Delta Daggers, and lastly F-106A Delta Dart interceptors.  In 1968, the squadron was redesignated the 87th Fighter-Interceptor Squadron and continued to operate F-106s until 1979.

In 1966, the Air Defense Command 29th Air Division, operated a Semi Automatic Ground Environment (SAGE) radar command and control center from the airport. SAGE was an automated control system for tracking and intercepting enemy bomber aircraft used by NORAD.  In later versions, the system could automatically direct aircraft to an interception by sending commands directly to the aircraft's autopilot. In 1969, the SAGE facility closed and the 23d Air Division replaced it.  The 23d AD which was responsible for the air defense of the upper midwest.

Minnesota Air National Guard
The USAF phased out its Air Defense facilities in 1982, but the Minnesota ANG continues its operations.

Along with its commercial airport usage, the Minnesota Air National Guard's 148th Fighter Wing (148 FW), an Air Combat Command (ACC)-gained unit, is located at the airport. The air national guard base occupies  on the northeast corner of the airport. The base has a total of 37 buildings; 18 industrial and 19 administrative. Normal ANG population is 320 personnel but surges to 1100 at least once each month during unit training assembly (UTA) drill sessions for the entire wing. The 148th previously flew the F-16A ADF and currently flies the F-16C Fighting Falcon.

Known ADCOM units assigned
 23d ADCOM Region, 8 December 1978
 Transferred to ADTAC as 23d NORAD Region, 1 October 1979-31 December 1983
 Duluth Air Defense Sector, 8 October 1957
 Re-designated: 29th Air Division, 1 April 1966
 Re-designated: 23d Air Division, 19 November 1969-15 April 1982
 514th Air Defense Group, 16 February 1953
 Re-designated: 343d Fighter Group, 18 August 1955-1 January 1959
 11th Fighter-Interceptor Squadron (FIS), 1 December 1952-30 June 1968
 4787th Air Base Squadron, 1 December 1952
 Re-designated: 4787th Air Base Group, 28 August 1970-31 December 1983
 4645th Air Defense Squadron (SAGE), 1 July 1972
 Re-designated: 23d Air Defense Squadron (ADS)/(SAGE), 1 January 1975-31 December 1983
 179th Fighter-Interceptor Squadron (Federalized Minnesota Air National Guard) (ANG), 2 March 1951 – 1 December 1952 (F-51D)
 74th Air Defense Missile Squadron (BOMARC), 1 April 1960 – 30 April 1972

Based units 
Flying and notable non-flying units based at Duluth Air National Guard Base.

United States Air Force 
Air National Guard

 Minnesota Air National Guard
 148th Fighter Wing
 Headquarters 148th Fighter Wing
 148th Operations Group
 179th Fighter Squadron – F-16C Fighting Falcon
 148th Operations Support Flight
 148th Maintenance Group
 148th Aircraft Maintenance Squadron
 148th Maintenance Operations Flight
 148th Maintenance Squadron
 148th Medical Group
 148th Mission Support Group
 148th Civil Engineering Squadron
 148th Communications Squadron
 148th Logistics Readiness Squadron
 148th Security Forces Squadron

See also
 List of USAF Aerospace Defense Command General Surveillance Radar Stations
 List of United States Air Force aircraft control and warning squadrons

References

  A Handbook of Aerospace Defense Organization 1946 - 1980,  by Lloyd H. Cornett and Mildred W. Johnson, Office of History, Aerospace Defense Center, Peterson Air Force Base, Colorado
 Winkler, David F. (1997), Searching the skies: the legacy of the United States Cold War defense radar program. Prepared for United States Air Force Headquarters Air Combat Command.
 Information for Duluth AFS, MN
 information for Duluth (BOMARC), MN

Installations of the United States Air Force in Minnesota
Installations of the United States Air National Guard
Buildings and structures in Duluth, Minnesota
Duluth–Superior metropolitan area
Military facilities in Minnesota
Semi-Automatic Ground Environment sites
1948 establishments in Minnesota
Military airbases established in 1948